A palloza (also known as pallouza or pallaza) is a traditional dwelling of the Serra dos Ancares of northwest Spain.

Structure
A palloza is a traditional thatched house as found in Leonese county of El Bierzo, Serra dos Ancares in Galicia, and south-west of Asturias; corresponding to Astur tribes area, one of pre Hispano-Celtic inhabitants of northwest Hispania. It is circular or oval, and about ten or twenty metres in diameter and is built to withstand severe winter weather at a typical altitude of 1,200 metres.

The main structure is stone, and is divided internally into separate areas for the family and their animals, with separate entrances. The roof is conical, made from rye straw on a wooden frame. There is no chimney, the smoke from the kitchen fire seeps out through the thatch.

As well as living space for humans and animals, a palloza has its own bread oven, workshops for wood, metal and leather work, and a loom. Only the eldest couple of an extended family had their own bedroom, which they shared with the youngest children. The rest of the family slept in the hay loft, in the roof space.

Origin
The palloza is pre-Roman. Pallozas have similarities with the round houses of the Iron Age in Great Britain such as Chysauster in Cornwall and the buildings of the Castro culture. 

Its name is actually a corruption of the Galician word "pallaza", first used in the late 19th century by ethnographers such as German Fritz Krüger, who was referring to the material used to make the roof. The traditional name of these buildings is in fact casa de teito or casa de teitu.

The term palloza (spelled palhoça) is also used in the Portuguese language, where it describes a type of small cabin built with wood and thatched roof.

Today

Pallozas were used until the second half of the 20th century, when improved communications brought modern building concepts to the area. Pallozas survive in Galicia, comarca of Os Ancares, and in several areas of Candín and western Asturias. The remarkable pallozas in the Bierzan town of Campo del Agua was largely destroyed by a fire in the mid 1980s. The most famous may be that of Piornedo, which since the 1970s has been an ethnographic museum. New pallozas are  used mainly as holiday homes, even in remote areas, where they were not traditionally used.

See also 
 Roundhouse (dwelling)
 Rondavel

References

External links 

 Pictures and information about the "Casa do Sesto", palloza museum at Piornedo
 Los Ancares, a very special place
 Structure of a palloza (in Galician)
 Full list of pallozas and thatched dwellings in all Galicia (in Galician)

House types
Prehistoric Europe
Architecture in Spain
Spanish culture
Vernacular architecture